Masuno is a surname. Notable people with the surname include:

Genta Masuno (born 1993), Japanese hurdler
Hidetomo Masuno (born 1975), Japanese comedian, narrator, actor, playwright, and lyricist
Shunmyō Masuno (born 1953), Japanese monk and garden designer

See also
Masuo